The 2013 Green Bay Blizzard season was the team's eleventh season as a football franchise and fourth in the Indoor Football League (IFL). One of just nine teams competing in the IFL for the 2013 season, the Green Bay Blizzard were members of the United Conference. The team played their home games at the Resch Center in the Green Bay suburb of Ashwaubenon, Wisconsin.

The Blizzard began the season under the direction of head coach Robert Fuller but he was replaced after six games by Chad Baldwin. The team ended the regular season with a 4–10 record and did not qualify for the playoffs. They drew an average attendance of 3,812 for their seven regular season games. After failing to turn reach certain unspecified "financial benchmarks", three of the four principal owners of the team agreed to place the franchise for sale in June 2013. If a new owner had not been found by September 1, 2013, the franchise would have suspended operations for the 2014 IFL season.

Off-field moves
Shortly before the 2013 season began, the owner of the Cheyenne Warriors died which forced that team to suspend operations and the IFL to revise its schedule to accommodate the now 9-team league.

The March 23, 2013, game against the Chicago Slaughter was "Military Appreciation Night" with free tickets for veterans and all fans in attendance received a personal American flag. Children also received replicas of the special "camouflage" Blizzard jersey.

After the April 7th loss dropped the team's record to 1–5, head coach Robert Fuller was fired and defensive coordinator Chad Badwin was promoted to replace him.

Roster moves
Junior Aumavae, a nose tackle who spent the 2012 season playing for the Blizzard, was signed by the New York Jets in late March 2013.

Schedule
Key:

Preseason

Regular season

Roster

Standings

References

External links
Green Bay Blizzard official statistics
2013 IFL regular season schedule

Green Bay Blizzard seasons
Green Bay Blizzard
Green Bay Blizzard